James Carter Cathcart (born March 8, 1954) is an American voice actor, script adaptor, voice director, pianist and vocalist known for providing the English voice for James, Meowth and Professor Oak in the Pokémon franchise since 2005.

Career
Cathcart has been playing with bands since high school, including The Laughing Dogs who released two albums on Columbia in 1979-80 and has been the vocalist of the Carter Cathcart Band since 1981. Cathcart also co-wrote the song "Remember Me" with Kiss guitarist Ace Frehley that ended up on Frehley's 1989 solo album Trouble Walkin'.

Cathcart's first voiceover part was O.G. Readmore on the ABC Weekend Special. After that, he recorded voice overs for Kit Kat candy bars, Good Humor, Coors Light, and others. Cathcart later auditioned in voice acting and has since become known for a prolific amount of anime dub voice work for Central Park Media, Media Blasters, DuArt Film and Video, TAJ Productions, NYAV Post and 4Kids Entertainment.

Filmography

Animated film

Animation

Anime

Video games

Production credits

Voice director
Bride of Darkness

References

External links 
 

1954 births
Living people
American male singers
American male voice actors
American male video game actors
American voice directors